Eduard Freiherr von Feuchtersleben (1798–1857) was a Kraków-born mining engineer and writer.

Biography
His parents were Josephine (1772–1801) and Ernst von Feuchtersleben (1765–1834), an engineer from Hildburghausen. Eduard's half-brother was Baron Ernst von Feuchtersleben, son of Ernst von Feuchtersleben from his second marriage.

Josephine was the daughter of Angelo Soliman (1721–1796) whose body was secretly claimed after his death by Austrian Emperor Francis II who had Abbé Eberl remove the skin and stuff it for display as an African "savage" in his cabinet of curiosities.

At least since 1817, Eduard von Feuchtersleben wrote small plays, essays and poetry, which were printed since 1822. Since 1832, he was employed as a mining engineer in salt production in Aussee.

By his extensive enthusiasm for poetry in the romantic spirit, he encouraged his half-brother Ernst von Feuchtersleben to also deal with poetry. Eduard and Ernst von Feuchtersleben were deeply attached to each other, and Ernst dedicated some of his texts to the older half-brother. Ernst also campaigned for a complete edition of Eduard's works, but this project was never brought to fruition.

Eduard von Feuchtersleben never married and had no children.

References

1798 births
1857 deaths
Polish male writers
Mining engineers
Austrian people of Nigerian descent
Polish people of Nigerian descent
Writers from Kraków
Date of birth missing
Date of death missing
Von Feuchtersleben Family